Shahvarpalur (also Romanized as Shahvārpālūr; also known as Shahvār) is a village in Howmeh Rural District, in the Central District of Minab County, Hormozgan Province, Iran. At the 2006 census, its population was 1,147, in 225 families.

References 

Populated places in Minab County